Jean Hoffman may refer to:
 Jean Hoffman (water polo), Belgian water polo player
 Jean L. Hoffman, social entrepreneur and educator

See also
 Gene Hoffman (disambiguation)